Juliette Bussière Laforest-Courtois (Cap-Français, Saint-Domingue (later Haiti) 1789 – 24 December 1853), was a Haitian teacher and journalist. She co-founded and managed the first school in Haiti opened to girls (1818–1828) and co-managed the paper La Feuille du Commerce where she was active as a journalist (1828–1853). She was the first journalist of her gender in Haiti.

Life

She was a member of the affranchi. Shortly after birth, she followed her father to Paris, where she received an education. 

She settled in Haiti after her marriage to Joseph Courtois in 1816. From 1818 to 1828 the couple managed their own co-educational school, La Maison d'Education. She tutored in music and literature at this school. It was at the time the only school open to girls; while President Petion did establish a girls school under the management of Madame Drury in 1816, it had been only a temporary experiment, which made the Courtois school a pioneer school for girls. When it was closed, there were no formal education for girls in Haiti until the Imperial girls schools Pensionnat national de demoiselles and the Collège Olive in 1850. 

She also managed the paper La Feuille du Commerce jointly with her husband. No other woman would work as a journalist in Haiti until Anna Augustin's founding of "Fémina" in 1923. The paper voiced the opposition against president Boyer and later emperor Soulouque. Her husband was sentenced to jail during both regimes, during which she managed the paper by herself. Ms. Laforest-Courtois would subsequently assume complete leadership of the daily after her husband's passing in and manage it for a decade until her passing in 1853.

References
 Mémoire de femmes, Jasmine Claude Narcisse, "Juliette Bussière Laforest-Courtois", http://jasminenarcisse.com/memoire/02_independance/06_juliette.html
 Dictionnaire biographique de Duraciné Pouilh, dans Femmes haïtiennes
 https://www.ayitifanmfomagazin.com/single-post/2019/03/08/femmes-en-haiti-quelques-rep%C3%A8res-chronologiques

Haitian people of Mulatto descent
People from Cap-Haïtien
1789 births
1853 deaths
19th-century Haitian people
Haitian journalists
People of Saint-Domingue
19th-century Haitian educators
19th-century journalists
19th-century Haitian women